Michael "Duffy" Conroy is an American college basketball coach and currently an assistant coach with the Tulsa Golden Hurricane basketball team.

Biography
A native of Davenport, Iowa, Conroy is married with four children. He attended St. Ambrose University, where he played on the men's basketball team. Conroy's brother, Ed, currently is in his second stint as head coach at The Citadel.

Coaching career
After serving in various position with the Panthers and the Wisconsin Badgers and at Assumption High School in Davenport, Iowa, he rejoined the Panthers as an assistant coach in 2005.

References

Living people
Basketball coaches from Illinois
Basketball players from Illinois
College men's basketball players in the United States
High school basketball coaches in Iowa
Milwaukee Panthers men's basketball coaches
Louisiana Tech Bulldogs basketball coaches
Sportspeople from Naperville, Illinois
St. Ambrose University alumni
American men's basketball players
Year of birth missing (living people)